Alumni Arena may refer to:
 Alumni Arena (Armstrong State University), arena on the campus of Armstrong State University, Georgia
 Alumni Arena (SUNY Cortland), ice arena on the campus of SUNY Cortland, New York
 Alumni Arena (University at Buffalo), arena on the campus of the University at Buffalo, New York